Walter IV ( (1205–1246) was the count of Brienne from 1205 to 1246.

Life
Walter was the son of Walter III of Brienne and Elvira of Sicily. Around the time of his birth, his father lost his bid for the Sicilian throne and died in prison. His inheritance of the Principality of Taranto and the County of Lecce was confiscated. He took part in the War of the Keys in 1228–1229 in an effort to recover it.

While a teenager, Walter was sent to Outremer where his uncle John of Brienne was the ruler of Jerusalem. In 1221 John gave him the County of Jaffa and Ascalon, and arranged a marriage with Maria (before March, 1215 – ca. 1252 or 1254), daughter of Hugh I of Cyprus, in 1233.

Even after his uncle had been forced out of the kingdom by Frederick II, Walter remained one of the most important lords of the Kingdom of Jerusalem.  He participated in the Crusade of Theobald I of Navarre in 1239 and was among the many French Crusaders captured by the Ayyubids. He was commander of the Crusader army that marched against the forces of as-Salih Ayyub at the Battle of La Forbie in 1244. Against the advice of al-Mansur of Homs, his Syrian ally, Walter insisted on taking the offensive, rather than fortifying his camp and awaiting the retreat of the Khwarezmians. In this disastrous battle, the Crusader-Syrian forces were nearly annihilated. Walter was captured, tortured before the walls of Jaffa, and ultimately turned over to the Egyptians after the Khwarezmian defeat before Homs in 1246. He was imprisoned in Cairo and murdered by merchants whose caravans he had robbed.

He was succeeded by his elder son John, who died childless. His younger son Hugh of Brienne settled in Southern Italy and became a partisan of Charles of Anjou, who returned to him the family's county of Lecce.

References

Sources

176

 
 

1205 births
1246 deaths
Christians of the Crusades
Christians of the Barons' Crusade
Counts of Brienne
House of Brienne